Tang Yuqin (born 12 May 1963) is a Chinese cross-country skier. She competed at the 1984 Winter Olympics and the 1988 Winter Olympics.

References

External links
 

1963 births
Living people
Chinese female cross-country skiers
Olympic cross-country skiers of China
Cross-country skiers at the 1984 Winter Olympics
Cross-country skiers at the 1988 Winter Olympics
Skiers from Jilin
Asian Games medalists in cross-country skiing
Cross-country skiers at the 1986 Asian Winter Games
Medalists at the 1986 Asian Winter Games
Asian Games gold medalists for China
Asian Games bronze medalists for China